Ooni Ekun was the 13th Ooni of Ife, a paramount traditional ruler of Ile Ife, the ancestral home of the Yorubas. He succeeded Odidimode Rogbeesin and was succeeded by  
Ooni Ajimuda.

References

Oonis of Ife
Yoruba history